Mathemalchemy is a traveling art installation dedicated to a celebration of the intersection of art and mathematics.  It is a collaborative work led by Duke University mathematician Ingrid Daubechies and fiber artist Dominique Ehrmann. The cross-disciplinary team of 24 people, who collectively built the installation during the calendar years 2020 and 2021, includes artists, mathematicians, and craftspeople who employed a wide variety of materials to illustrate, amuse, and educate the public on the wonders, mystery, and beauty of mathematics.  Including the core team of 24, about 70 people contributed in some way to the realization of Mathemalchemy.

Description
Versions of some of the complex mathematical objects can be purchased through an associated "Mathemalchemy Boutique" website.

The art installation contains puns (such as "Pi" in a bakery) and Easter eggs, such as a miniature model of the Antikythera mechanism hidden on the bottom of "Knotilus Bay". Mathematically sophisticated visitors may enjoy puzzling out and decoding the many mathematical allusions symbolized in the exhibit, while viewers of all levels are invited to enjoy the self-guided tours, detailed explanations, and videos available on the accompanying official website .

A downloadable comic book was created to explore some of the themes of the exhibition, using an independent narrative set in the world of Mathemalchemy.

Themes

The installation features or illustrates mathematical concepts at many different levels. All of the participants regard  "recreational mathematics"—especially when it has a strong visual component—as having an important role in education and in culture in general. Jessica Sklar maintains that "mathematics is, at heart, a human endeavor" and feels compelled to make it accessible to those who don't regard themselves as "math people". Bronna Butler talks about the heritage of JH Conway, whose lectures were "almost magical in quality" because they used what looked like curios and tricks but in the end arrived at answers to "fundamental questions of mathematics". 

Henry Segerman, who wrote the book Visualizing Mathematics With 3D Printing, contributed 3D pieces that explore stereographic projection and polyhedra. According to Susan Goldstine, "The interplay between mathematics and fiber arts is endlessly fascinating [and] allows for a deeper understanding ways that these crafts can illuminate complex concepts in mathematics". Edmund Harriss says, "You don’t need a background in math to appreciate the installation, just like you can enjoy a concert without being a musician".

The creators had the goal of illustrating as much of mathematics as possible. Thus the various exhibits touch on number theory, fractals, tessellations, probability theory, Zeno's paradoxes, Venn diagrams, knot theory, calculus, chaos theory, topology, hyperbolic geometry, symbolic logic—and much else—all in a setting that is beautiful and fun. Mathematicians explicitly mentioned or alluded to include Vladimir Arnold, John H. Conway, Felix Klein, Sofya Kovalevskaya, Henri Lebesgue, Ada Lovelace, Benoit Mandelbrot, Maryam Mirzakhani, August Möbius, Emmy Noether, Marjorie Rice, Bernhard Riemann, Caroline Series, Wacław Sierpiński, Alicia Boole Stott, William Thurston, Helge von Koch, Gladys West, Zeno, and many others.

Twenty of the "mathemalchemists" are women, and the facility especially celebrates the contributions of women in mathematics, from amateur Marjorie Rice, who found new kinds of pentagon tilings, to Maryam Mirzakhani, the first woman to ever garner a Fields Medal.

Gallery

History

Daubechies and Ehrmann presented the project in a special session at the 2020 Joint Mathematics Meetings (JMM) in Denver, Colorado. They soon had a core group of more than a dozen interested mathematicians and artists who in turn suggested other people not at JMM.  Eventually the group would grow to 24 people.

Originally, the intent was to collectively design and fabricate in a series of workshops to be held at Duke University in Durham, North Carolina, starting in March 2020. The COVID-19 pandemic disrupted these plans. Working instead over Zoom, under the guidance of Dominique Ehrmann and various "team leaders" for different parts of the installation, the  installation was collectively designed and discussed. 

In July 2021 the team could finally get together at Duke for the first in-person meeting, where the components that had been fabricated in various locations in the US and Canada were assembled for the first time, leading to the first complete full-scale construction. The 24 members of the team employed ceramics, knitting, crocheting, quilting, beadwork, 3D printing, welding, woodworking, textile embellishment, origami, metal-folding, water-sculpted brick, and temari balls to create the room-sized installation.

The finished installation was originally displayed at Duke before moving to the National Academy of Sciences (NAS) building in Washington DC, where it was on display from  December 4, 2021, until June 12, 2022. The inaugural exhibit at NAS closed with "Mathemalchemy Family Day" on June 12.  The installation showed at Juniata College in Huntingdon, Pennsylvania from June 23 through December 3, 2022.  The installation was shown at Boston University from January 4 through March 4, 2023, partially overlapping with the 2023 Joint Mathematics Meetings in Boston.

Planned future venues include Vancouver, Canada (Summer through Fall 2023), Seattle, and Atlanta (Spring 2024 through Fall 2024). The exhibit is planned to ultimately reside in the Duke mathematics building, on permanent display.

See also
 Mathematica: A World of Numbers... and Beyond – 1961 iconic mathematics exhibition by Ray and Charles Eames
 Mathematics and art

References

External links
 
 Mathemalchemy Art Installation on YouTube

Installation art works
Recreational mathematics
Mathematics organizations
Mathematics conferences
Mathematics education
Mathematics and art
Traveling exhibits
Mathematics education in the United States
Art and design organizations
Organizations established in 2020
Artist groups and collectives
2020 establishments